The incorporation of Xinjiang into the People's Republic of China in 1949, known in Chinese historiography as the Peaceful Liberation of Xinjiang, refers to the takeover of the Republic of China's Xinjiang Province by the Chinese Communists and the People's Liberation Army, largely through political means, in the waning days of the Chinese Civil War.

In the late summer of 1949, the People's Liberation Army drove into the Hexi Corridor in Gansu Province and pressed toward Xinjiang. At the time, Xinjiang was ruled by a coalition government based in Dihua (now Urumqi), which comprised Chinese Nationalists (KMT) and representatives from the former Second East Turkestan Republic (ETR), a regime founded with the support of the Soviet Union in the Three Districts in northwestern Xinjiang during the Ili Rebellion in 1944 and then disbanded in 1946.  Under the coalition government which ruled Xinjiang from 1946 to 1949, the KMT controlled most of the province and leaders of the former ETR retained autonomy in the Three Districts.  In the fall of 1949, the Chinese Communists reached separate agreements with the political leadership of the KMT and the Three Districts.

The Chinese Communists persuaded the KMT provincial and military leadership to surrender.  The Soviet Union induced the leaders of the former ETR to accede to the Chinese Communists. In August 1949, four of top ETR leaders, Ehmetjan Qasim's delegation, died in a plane crash en route to Beijing to attend the Chinese People's Political Consultative Conference, the Chinese Communists' united front conference.  In December, China's new government incorporated the ETR military into the PLA, which marked the end of the independence of Xinjiang's second East Turkestan Republic. Most of the remaining former ETR leadership, i.e. Burhan Shahidi and others, accepted the absorption of the autonomous Three Districts into the newly founded People's Republic of China. They along with the surrendered KMT officials took senior positions in the PRC government.

Thus, the Chinese Communists' takeover of Xinjiang was largely achieved through political means. The PLA entered Xinjiang in October 1949 and controlled most of the vast region by the spring of 1950.  Among the major military actors in Xinjiang, only Yulbars Khan, a KMT loyalist, and Osman Batur, a former ETR commander turned KMT supporter, fought against the Chinese Communists.  They were both defeated by the PLA.

Accession of the Three Districts (ETR) 

The Second ETR, initially led by Elihan Tore, was founded in November 1944 during the Ili Rebellion with Soviet support and was based in three northwest districts of Xinjiang.  Tore disappeared in the Soviet Union in 1946, and another ETR leader, Ehmetjan Qasimi, head of the pro-Soviet Sinkiang Turkic People's National Liberation Committee (STPNLC), reached a political agreement with the Nationalist Chinese leader Zhang Zhizhong to form a coalition provincial government in Dihua (present day Urumqi).  The Second ETR was disbanded in name but the Three Districts retained autonomy.  Qasimi became the vice-chairman of the coalition government. In June 1947, the Nationalist Chinese forces clashed with Mongolian and Soviet forces at Beitashan in northeastern Xinjiang. In that conflict, Kazakh leader Osman Batur of the ETR repudiated the ETR and defected to join Nationalist Chinese forces in fighting against Soviet-backed Mongolian forces.

On 19 August 1949, Mao Zedong, the leader of the Chinese Communists telegraphed the leaders of the Three Districts, inviting them to attend the Inaugural Chinese People's Political Consultative Conference to be held in Beijing.  On 22 August, five leaders of the Three Districts, Ehmetjan Qasimi, Abdulkerim Abbas, Ishaq Beg Munonov, Luo Zhi and Dalelkhan Sugirbayev boarded a Soviet plane in Almaty and were headed for Chita but perished in a plane accident near Lake Baikal.  On 3 September, three other former ETR leaders including Saifuddin Azizi arrived in Beijing by train.  Azizi learned the news of the airplane crash from the Soviet Ambassador and informed the PRC negotiator Deng Liqun, but the deaths were not publicly announced.  Azizi and the remaining representatives from the Three Districts agreed to join the People's Republic of China, which was founded on 1 October.  The deaths of the other former ETR leaders were not announced until December after the PLA had control of northern Xinjiang and had reorganized the military forces of the Three Districts into the PLA.

Accession of the KMT in Xinjiang 

On 25 September, Tao Zhiyue, the KMT general and Burhan Shahidi, the KMT's political leader in Dihua announced the formal surrender of the Nationalist forces in Xinjiang to the Chinese Communists.  On 12 October, the PLA entered Xinjiang.  Many other Kuomintang generals in Xinjiang like the Salar Muslim General Han Youwen joined in the defection to the Communist People's Liberation Army. They continued to serve in the PLA as officers in Xinjiang.  Some KMT leaders who refused to submit fled to Taiwan or Turkey.  Ma Chengxiang fled via India to Taiwan.  Muhammad Amin Bughra and Isa Yusuf Alptekin fled to Turkey.  Masud Sabri was arrested by the Chinese Communists and died in prison in 1952.

The only organized resistance the PLA encountered was from Osman Batur's Kazak militia and from Yulbars Khan's White Russian and Hui troops who served the Republic of China.  Batur pledged his allegiance to the KMT and was killed in 1951. Yulbars Khan battled PLA forces at the Battle of Yiwu, but when he was deserted, he fled through Tibet, evading the Dalai Lama's forces which harassed him, and escaped to Taiwan via India to join the Republic of China regime.  The Xinjiang Uyghur Autonomous Region of the PRC was established on 1 October 1955, replacing the Xinjiang Province (1884–1955).

Legacy of the ETR in Xinjiang 
In the People's Republic of China, the five ETR leaders who perished in the 1949 plane crash are remembered as heroes in the struggle against the Nationalist regime. Their remains were returned to China in April 1950 and later reburied in a heroes' memorial cemetery in Yining.  The cemetery has a stele with calligraphy by Mao Zedong, praising the heroes for their contributions to the Chinese people's revolution.

Positions 
The East Turkistan Government-in-Exile views Xinjiang's integration into the People's Republic of China as an "illegal military occupation."

See also 
 History of Xinjiang
 Xinjiang conflict
 East Turkestan Independence Movement
 Xinjiang re-education camps
 Annexation of Tibet by the People's Republic of China

Notes

References

Citations

Sources 

 
 

20th century in Xinjiang
Wars involving the People's Republic of China
1949 in China